Pedram Khosronejad (born 1969) is a socio-cultural and visual anthropologist of contemporary Iran. He is of Iranian origin and commenced his studies in Painting (B.A. University of Art, Tehran, Iran) and in Visual Art Research (M.A. University of Art, Tehran, Iran) before moving to France with a PhD grant in 2000. He obtained his D.E.A. (Diplome d’Etudes Approfondies) at Ecole Pratique des Hautes Etudes (Sorbonne, Paris) and obtained his PhD at the École des Hautes Études en Sciences Sociales (Paris). His research interests include cultural and social anthropology, the anthropology of death and dying, visual anthropology, visual piety, devotional artefacts, and religious material culture, with a particular interest in Iran, Persianate societies and the Islamic world.

Since July 2020, Khosronejad is curator of Persian Arts at the Powerhouse Museum, Sydney, Australia;an adjunct professor at the Religion and Society Research Cluster in School of Social Sciences at Western Sydney University; and a fellow at the Department of Anthropology at Harvard University.

Between 2015 and 2019, Khosronejad was Farzaneh Family Scholar and associate director for Iranian and Persian Gulf Studies at the School of International Studies/School of Media&Strategic Communications of Oklahoma State University, U.S.

Between 2007 and 2015 he held the position of Goli Rais Larizadeh Fellow of the Iran Heritage Foundation for the Anthropology of Iran in the Department of Social Anthropology at the University of St Andrews. Since its creation, this full-time academic position remained the only academic appointment in Europe and the West dedicated entirely to the anthropology of Iran. 
 He is chair of The Anthropology of the Middle East and Central Eurasia Network of the European Association of Social Anthropologists.

German Civilian Expatriates of Persia & WWII
Since August 2019, Khosronejad has been working on a groundbreaking interdisciplinary research project regarding the German Civilian Expatriates of Persia (Iran), Australians who had been detained with their parents in Iran in 1941 after the country's invasion by the British and Soviet Armies during the Second World War. This project concerns the life stories of 512 German civilian internees who were detained in Australian internment camps and their contribution to the field of Iranian Studies and also to the development of Australia after the war period. It is astonishing to learn that Dr. Hans Eberhard Wulff the author of The Traditional Crafts of Persia, Prof. Wilhelm Max Eilers great orientalist and archaeologist, and Karl Jan Zoubek professor of music at the University of Tehran, were among them.

Photography of African Slavery in Qajar Era Iran
For the first time in the history of Iranian Studies, in 2014, when Khosronejad was a visiting professor at the Nantes Institute for Advanced Studies and at the same time held a Chair position at the University of Nantes in France, he discovered a new and controversial topic, the Photography of African Slavery in Qajar-Era Iran, through archival photography, interviews and scattered texts. Since then he has organised and curated more than fifteen academic photo exhibitions (e.g. University of California Davis, University of California Santa Barbara, and University of New South Wales), and has given talks and seminars in over twenty universities and museums all around the world (e.g. Johns Hopkins University, University of California Irvine, Schomburg Center, New York Public Library, University of Tehran, and National Library and Archive of Iran) regarding Iranian photography of African slavery and race, gender, and ethnic issues.

Publication: Qajar African Nannies: African Slaves and Aristocratic Babies (2017, New York: Iranian and Persian Gulf Studies), 70 pp., in Visual Studies of Modern Iran, Vol. I. 
Publication: Out of Focus, Photography of African Slavery in Qajar Iran, The Anthropology of the Contemporary Middle East and Central Eurasia 4/1 (2016), 1-31.
Exhibition Catalogues : Photography, Race and Slavery: African Sitters of Qajar Era Iran, In association with the Photographies in Motion: Explorations Across Space, Time, and Media workshop (2019, REID Library, The University of Western Australia, Perth, Australia).
Exhibition Catalogues : Unveiling the Veiled: Royal Consorts, Slaves and Prostitutes in Qajar Photographs (2018, Mosher Alumni House, McCune Library, University of California, Santa Barbara, California, U.S.).
Exhibition Catalogues : Re-imagining Iranian African Slavery: photography as material Culture (2018, the Buehler Alumni Center, University of California, Davis, California, U.S.).
Organizer and curator: Photography, Race and Slavery: African Sitters of Qajar Era Iran, In association with the Photographs in Motion: Explorations Across Space, Time, and Media workshop (REID Library, The University of Western Australia, Perth, Australia), November 2019.
Organizer and curator: Qajar Photography of African Slavery in Motion: Space, Time and Media, The University of Western Australia, Perth, Australia, October 2019.
Organizer and curator: Unveiling the Veiled: Royal Consorts, Slaves and Prostitutes in Qajar Photographs, Alumni Center, University of California, Santa Barbara, California, U.S., October 2018.
Organizer and curator: Re-imagining Iranian African Slavery: photography as material Culture, the Buehler Alumni Center, University of California, Davis, California, U.S., May–June 2018.
Organizer and curator: The Qajar Lens: Diversity in Qajar Photography, Iranian and Persian Gulf Studies, Oklahoma State University, U.S., March–May 2018.
Organizer and curator: Lost Souls: Photography, African Slavery and Anthropology, Institute for Iranian Contemporary Historical Studies, Tehran, Iran, January 2017.
Organizer and curator: African Slavery in Qajar Iran, National Library, Tehran, Iran, January 2017.
Paper: Photographs as Objects of Sexual Desire in Iran, Slavery and Sexual Labor in the Middle East and North Africa, University of California, Santa Barbara, U.S., October 2018.
Paper: Re-imagining Iranian African Slavery: photography as material Culture, Department of Anthropology, University of California, Davis, U.S., May 2018.
Paper: Digital Afterlives: from archive to cyberspace, The Lapidus Center inaugural conference, The Lapidus Center for the Historical Analysis of Transatlantic Slavery. The Schomburg Center for Research in Black Culture, the New York Public Library, New York, U.S., November 2017.
Paper: Photography and African Heritage in Qajar Iran, Department of African American and African Studies, University of California, Davis, U.S., May 2017.
Paper:  Lost Souls: Photography of African Eunuchs & Female Servants in Qajar Iran, Department of Near Eastern Languages and Cultures, University of California, Los Angeles, U.S., May 2017.
Paper: Photography of African Slavery in Iran: history, methodology and political challenges, Kansas African Studies Center and Dept. of Anthropology, University of Kansas, U.S., April 2017.
Paper: African Communities in Qajar Iran: using photographs as socio-historical resources, African Studies Center, Michigan State University, U.S., April 2017.
Paper: Out of Focus: Photography of African Slavery in Qajar Iran (updates from the field), Samuel Jordan Center for Persian Studies and Culture, University of California, Irvine, U.S., February 2017.
Paper:  History can Produce Anthropological Material: Photography, Material Culture and African Slavery in Iran, Department of History & Sociology, Open University, Mashhad, Iran, February 2017.
Paper: Did African Slavery exist in Iran: Photography, Ethno-history and Archival Research, Institute for Iranian Contemporary Studies Historical, Tehran, Iran, February 2017.
Paper: Methodology in History and Visual Anthropology: African Representations in Qajar Photography, Department of English Literature, Shiraz University, Shiraz, Iran, January 2017.
Paper: Photography of African Slavery in Modern Iran (1840s-1960s), Slavery in 19th and 20th Century Iran, 11th Biennial Iranian Studies Conference, Vienna, Austria, August 2016.
Paper: Lost Souls: Photography of African Slavery in Qajar Iran, Colloquium Series Fall 2016, Department of Anthropology, Johns Hopkins University, U.S., October 2016.
Interview: Qajar Iran and the Abolishment of African Slavery: Photography and History, World Economy, Iran, (in Persian) 2017.
Interview: Slavery Tales: History, Anthropology and Photography, Shahrvand Daily News, Iran, 2017. (in Persian).
Interview: Photography of African Slavery in Iran, Interview of Dr. Louise Siddons, Associate Professor of Art History (Department of Art, Oklahoma State University) with Dr. Pedram Khosronejad, 2016.
Interview: The face of African slavery in Qajar Iran – in pictures, the Guardian, 2016.
Interview: The face of African slavery in Qajar Iran-in pictures, the Guardian, January 14, 2016, Persian translation for the Centre for the Great Islamic Encyclopaedia by S. Ghomashchi.

Administrative and editorial activities
Founder and series editor, Iranian Studies, Berlin-Münster-Wien-Zürich-London:  LIT Verlag, 2014. 
Founder The Avini Collection, fully academic and university-based research collection (University of St Andrews, U.K.) which currently includes 516 books and films (both documentary and fiction) on different topics and angles vis-à-vis the Iran-Iraq war (1980-1988), 2013.
Founder and curator, Ethnographic Film and Media Festival of the Anthropology of the MiddleEast and Central Eurasia, 2012.
Founder and chief editor, Journal of Anthropology of the Contemporary Middle East and Central Eurasia (ACME), Sean Kingston Publishing, U.K, 2012.
Founder and series editor, The Anthropology of Persianate Societies, Sean Kingston Publishing, U.K, 2011. 
Founder and moderator, the Anthropology of the Middle East and Central Eurasia (Russia, the Caucasus, Central Asia, China) Network, European Association of Social Anthropologists, 2010.

Selected bibliography
Le Coran n'interdit pas la représentation du Prophète, Le Figaro, 21 Jan. 2015 
Untold Stories: The socio-cultural life of images in Qajar Era Iran (In Memoriam: Farrokh Ghafari/1921-2006) Iranian Studies, Germany (editor, 2015)
Women's Rituals and Ceremonies in Shiite Iran and Muslim Communities: Methodological and theoretical challenges Iranian Studies, Germany (editor, 2014).
Les Lions en Pierre Sculptée chez les Bakhtiari people|Bakhtiari: Description et significations de sculptures zoomorphes dans une société tribale du sud-ouest de l’Iran, The Anthropology of Persianate Societies, Volume 2, U.K.(Monograph, 2013).
Digital Art, Political Aesthetic and Social Media: Case Study of the Iranian Presidential Election of 2009,   International Journal of Communication.  (guest editor, 2013)
Iranian Sacred Defence Cinema: Religion, Martyrdom and National Identity, Sean Kingston Publishing, U.K. (Editor, 2012)
Unburied Memories: The Politics of Bodies, and the Material Culture of Sacred Defense Martyrs in Iran, Rutledge, U.K. (Editor, 2012)
Saints and their Pilgrims in Iran and Neighbouring Countries,  The Anthropology of Persianate Societies Series, Sean Kingston Publishing, U.K (Editor, 2012)
The Art and Material Culture of Iranian Shi'ism:  Iconography and Religious Devotion in Shi'i Islam, I.B. Tauris Publishers, U.K.  (Editor, 2011)

Films
Lion Tombstones and their Sculptors- Trailer Date: 2014, Running time: 70', Director: Pedram Khosronejad, Camera: Marie Chevais, Pedram Khosronejad,Editing: Sepideh Abtahi037
The Last Lions of Bakhtiyari (Dedicated to David Brooks) Date: 2014, Research, camera and sound: Pedram Khosronejad, Director: Pedram Khosronejad, 25 mins, DVD, Color, Narration in French by Jean-Claude Carriere, Postproduction: CNRS-Image

Online multimedia research platforms
Art from German WWII Internees of Persia in Australia 
German Civilian Expatriates of Persia & WWII 
Bakhtiari Sacred Landscape 
Bakhtiari Women's Lamentations 
Sorudkhani and Shahnamehkhani among the Bakhtiari

References

External links
 Personal website 
 Personal page (Western Sydney University) 
 LinkedIn 
 The Anthropology of the Middle East and Central Eurasia Network 
 Academic.edu 

1969 births
Living people
Iranian anthropologists
École pratique des hautes études alumni
People from Tehran
Academics of the University of St Andrews
School for Advanced Studies in the Social Sciences alumni
University of Tehran alumni